Jesus Hates Zombies is a series of graphic comic novels written by Stephen Lindsay, with art by various artists. Yea, Though I Walk was drawn by Steve Cobb in the first issue and Daniel Thollin for the remaining issues.

Publication history
Those Slack-Jaw Blues was originally self-published by Stephen Lindsay in October 2007. It was then re-published by Alterna Comics in November 2007. All four volumes of Yea, Though I Walk were also published by Alterna Comics until May 2010.

Jesus Hates Zombies has moved publishers to 215Ink with a collection of all the Jesus Hates Zombies stories to date and is available via 215Ink and Comixology as of February 2020.

Plot
In a not so distant future, zombies have overrun the earth. Fearing for the future of humanity, God sends his son Jesus Christ to save humanity. Upon returning, he finds that his powers are greatly diminished as they are tied to others' faith in him. So he sets out to find the last remaining faithful and rally them to his cause.

Along the way he comes across various friends including Mother Teresa, Elvis Presley, a stripper named King, and a time traveling Abraham Lincoln.

Collected editions
The series was released in a variety of forms. The first stories were in a standard sized anthology. Yea, Though I Walk was serialized in a series of 4 digest size books:
Those Slack-Jaw Blues (144 pages, November 2007)
Jesus Hates Zombies/Lincoln Hates Werewolves: Yea, Though I Walk Vol. 1 (64 pages, September 2008)
Jesus Hates Zombies/Lincoln Hates Werewolves: Yea, Though I Walk Vol. 2 (64 pages, April 2009)
Jesus Hates Zombies/Lincoln Hates Werewolves: Yea, Though I Walk Vol. 3 (64 pages, November 2009)
Jesus Hates Zombies/Lincoln Hates Werewolves: Yea, Though I Walk Vol. 4 (64 pages, May 2010)

Other media
Michael Mongillo wrote the screenplay along with actor Jason Alan Smith and was originally slated to helm the project as director, however, Mongillo has since moved into a Producer role and directing responsibilities have been taken up by actor Eric Balfour.  Mali Elfman and Jason Alan Smith are also on board to Produce.

The movie is in development as of February 2020.

See also
Loaded Bible
The Walking Dead (comics)

Notes

References

Jesus Hates Zombies: Those Slack-Jaw Blues at Comic Book DB
Jesus Hates Zombies/Lincoln Hates Werewolves Yea Though I Walk  at Comic Book DB

External links
An early review of Those Slack-Jaw Blues

Depictions of Jesus in literature
Zombies in comics